Peng Shimeng (born 12 May 1998) is a Chinese association football player.

Peng participated in the 2019 FIFA Women's World Cup. She was named Player of the Match in China PR's draw with Spain.

References

External links 
 

1998 births
Living people
Women's association football goalkeepers
Chinese women's footballers
China women's international footballers
Footballers from Jiangsu
2019 FIFA Women's World Cup players
Footballers at the 2020 Summer Olympics
Olympic footballers of China